Food Export Association of the Midwest USA (Food Export-Midwest) is a non-profit organization that promotes the export of food and agricultural products from the Midwestern region of the United States. The organization has been helping U.S. suppliers of Midwestern food and agricultural products sell overseas since 1969.

Food Export - Midwest is one of four State Regional Trade Groups (SRTGs) that assist companies with export promotion.  Three other regional groups, Food Export USA-Northeast (Food Export - Northeast), Southern United States Trade Association (SUSTA), and Western U.S. Agricultural Trade Association (WUSATA) provide similar services for companies based or sourcing product from outside of the Food Export-Midwest thirteen-state region.

History 
Founded in 1969, Food Export – Midwest was created as a cooperative effort between 13 Midwestern state agricultural promotion agencies United States Department of Agriculture's Foreign Agricultural Service (FAS).  Those states are Illinois, Indiana, Iowa, Kansas, Michigan, Minnesota Missouri, Nebraska, North Dakota, Ohio, Oklahoma, South Dakota, and Wisconsin.

Market Access Program 
Food Export - Midwest is one of several organizations that administer its programs each year through Market Access Program funding. Through the Market Access Program (MAP), The United States Department of Agriculture's (USDA) Foreign Agricultural Service (FAS) "partners with U.S. agricultural trade associations, cooperatives, state regional trade groups and small businesses to share the costs of overseas marketing and promotional activities that help build commercial export markets for U.S. agricultural products and commodities."

Strategic alliance 
In April 2000, Food Export – Midwest entered into a strategic alliance with Food Export – Northeast.  Both organizations thereafter collaborated on activities, markets, programs and services to greatly expand the available resources for U.S. companies in their regions.

Programs and services 
Food Export – Midwest offers a variety of programs and services to help exporters of Midwestern food and agricultural products begin or expand their international sales. Food Export – Midwest's export strategy includes three primary components: Exporter Education, Market Entry and Market Promotion. The objective for these programs is to provide U.S. exporters resources to pursue the export market for their food and agricultural products.
Food Export-Midwest programs and services are designed to educate U.S. suppliers about exporting, find new customers and increase their volume of export sales.

Export Education
Food Export - Midwest provides valuable educational services to U.S. Suppliers who export food and agriculture products. Entering the export market takes know-how. Exporter Education programs provide information and education in a variety of formats to help companies increase their exporter knowledge.

Export Essentials Online– An 11 chapter online learning system to help companies learn how to export successfully.
Food Export Helpline – A one on one conversation with an industry expert who can help you navigate the complicated issues of exporting.
Seminars – Hands-on seminars throughout the year held at a variety of locations on export industry topics.
Webinars – Webinars provide up to date exporter intelligence for companies regarding a variety of industry topics.

Market Entry
Food Export – Midwest provides a variety of Market Entry activities to help companies of all levels of exporting experience increase their global reach.
Market Builder – Provides customized research to help your company uncover potential in international markets.
Buyers Missions – Meet international buyers and promote your products without leaving the U.S.
Food Show PLUS! – Maximize your tradeshow success with introductions to qualified buyers, in-market briefings, on-site assistance, self-guided retail tours and post-show lead qualifications.
Trade Leads - If you have participated in any Food Export activity such as a Market Builder, Buyers Mission, Food Show PLUS!, Focused Trade Mission or Branded Program, you can receive leads at no cost to you. Food Export – Midwest's network of In-Market Representatives and the USDA/Foreign Agricultural Service offices meet with qualified buyers throughout the year and provide leads to Food Export – Midwest.
Export Advisor Program - A year-long service which provides custom assistance from an experienced advisor to help your company kick start or improve your exporting efforts.

Market Promotion
Branded Program – A Market Access Program (MAP) funded program that provides eligible companies up to a 50% cost-reimbursement for qualified international marketing expenses.

References

External links
Website of the Food Export Association of the Midwest USA
National Association of State Departments of Agriculture page on Food Export Association of the Midwest USA

Trade associations based in the United States
Business and industry organizations based in Chicago
Midwestern United States